Dolnje Impolje (in older sources also Dolenje Impole) is a small settlement in the Sava Hills in the Municipality of Sevnica in central Slovenia. The area is part of the historical region of Lower Carniola and is now included in the Lower Sava Statistical Region.

References

External links
Dolnje Impolje at Geopedia

Populated places in the Municipality of Sevnica